Union Pacific 6916 is a DDA40X diesel locomotive built for the Union Pacific Railroad. It now resides in the Eccles Rail Center at the Utah State Railroad Museum in Ogden, Utah.

History
Union Pacific 6916 is one of 47 DDA40X locomotives built. The DDA40X was nicknamed "Centennial" after the 100th anniversary of the driving of the Golden Spike in 1869, which signified the completion of the Transcontinental Railroad. They are unique in that they are actually two power units on a single  frame, and are noted as being the largest diesel locomotives in the world.

UP 6916 was built by the Electro-Motive Division of General Motors in November 1969, as one of a series of 47 locomotives of the same type. By June 22, 1980, 6916 was placed in storage due to a decrease in traffic. It was returned to service soon after, but by 1983, most of the DDA40X types were stored out of service in Yermo, California. In 1984, a motive power crunch caused Union Pacific to reinstate 25 of the locomotives, including 6916. The locomotive was finally retired from service on May 16, 1985, and internally gutted as a parts source for SD40 and SD40-2 diesels. The unit was donated "as is" to the Utah State Railroad Museum in 1986.

As of 2022, Union Pacific 6916 remains on static display, being one of thirteen surviving Centennials.

In popular culture

UP 6916 was featured on the cover of the March 1985 issue of Pacific RailNews.
The unit served as the prototype for an O-scale brass model released by Ajin and imported to the United States by Overland Models, in 1999.

Gallery

See also
Union Pacific 6936 - another surviving DDA40X

References

6916
D-D locomotives
Electro-Motive Division locomotives
Diesel-electric locomotives of the United States